The Bank of College Grove in College Grove, Tennessee, opened in a frame building in 1911, and the building was significantly remodelled in 1927, with the exterior gaining a brick veneer and Doric pilasters.  The building was listed on the National Register of Historic Places in 1988.

The bank had assets of $27,000 at the end of its first year, and was a successful venture for the next two decades.  Unlike several other Williamson County banks in rural areas, such as Bank of Nolensville, Thompson Station Bank, and a bank at Leiper's Fork, the College Grove bank then survived the Great Depression, and continued in operation at this location until 1965, when it moved to a building next door.

The property was listed on the National Register as part of a 1988 study of Williamson County historical resources.

References

1911 establishments in Tennessee
Bank buildings on the National Register of Historic Places in Tennessee
Buildings and structures in Williamson County, Tennessee
Commercial buildings completed in 1911
National Register of Historic Places in Williamson County, Tennessee